St. Elmo is a ghost town in Chaffee County, Colorado, United States. Nearly 2,000 people settled in this town when mining for gold and silver started. The mining industry started to decline in the early 1920s, and in 1922 the railroad discontinued service. The community is listed on the National Register of Historic Places as the St. Elmo Historic District. It is one of Colorado's best preserved ghost towns.

History
St. Elmo was originally named Forest City but was later changed because of the multitude of towns with the same name. The name St. Elmo was chosen by Griffith Evans, one of the founding fathers, who was reading a novel with the same title.

The town was at its peak in the 1890s, when it included a telegraph office, general store, town hall, five hotels, saloons, dancing halls, a newspaper office, and a school house. The town's first and longest running newspaper, the St. Elmo Mountaineer, began reporting on the town's mining activities in August 1880 and ran until 1895. The Denver, South Park and Pacific Railroad line ran through St. Elmo.  There were 150 patented mine claims within the area.  The majority of the people who lived in St. Elmo worked at the Mary Murphy, Teresa C., The Molly or the Pioneer Mines.  The Mary Murphy Mine was the largest and most successful mine in the area.  The Mary Murphy Mine recovered over $60,000,000 worth of gold while it was in operation.  While the other mines eventually shut down, the Mary Murphy Mine continued to operate until the railroad was abandoned in 1922.

Once the mining industry shut down, St. Elmo drastically declined in population. Miners searched elsewhere for gold and silver and the business district in St. Elmo closed down as well. Few people continued to live in the town.  Postal service was discontinued in 1952 after the death of St. Elmo's postmaster.

St. Elmo today

St. Elmo is considered a ghost town, though it is still inhabited.  Many tourists visit St. Elmo, and the former mining roads are now used as off-road vehicle trails.  There are places to fish along Chalk Creek, which runs through St. Elmo.  The general store is open during the summer, when tourists can rent off-road vehicles or buy items.  Many buildings are extant, though the town hall and a few other buildings were destroyed by fire in 2002.  Buena Vista Heritage is rebuilding the town hall to its original state.

Gallery

See also
National Register of Historic Places listings in Chaffee County, Colorado

References

Ghost towns in Colorado
Former populated places in Chaffee County, Colorado
Historic districts on the National Register of Historic Places in Colorado
Tourist attractions in Chaffee County, Colorado
National Register of Historic Places in Chaffee County, Colorado
Populated places on the National Register of Historic Places in Colorado